The Phipps Institute for the Study, Treatment and Prevention of Tuberculosis at the University of Pennsylvania was established in 1903 with a grant from Henry Phipps, a former business partner of Andrew Carnegie.

References 

Laboratories in the United States
Clinical pathology
University of Pennsylvania
Tuberculosis organizations
Educational institutions established in 1903
1903 establishments in Pennsylvania